John Maxwell Cowley (18 February 1923 – 18 May 2004) was an American Regents Professor at Arizona State University. The John M. Cowley Center for High-Resolution Electron Microscopy at Arizona State is named in his honor.

References

1923 births
2004 deaths
Fellows of the Australian Academy of Science
Fellows of the Royal Society
Australian physicists
Arizona State University faculty
Australian expatriates in the United States